Frederick Mellinger (15 November 1890 – 29 August 1970) was a German actor.

Filmography
 Hitler – Beast of Berlin (1939)
 The Hunchback of Notre Dame (1939)
 Dr. Ehrlich's Magic Bullet (1940)
 A Dispatch from Reuters (1940)

References

External links
 
 Peter-R. Koenig, Gnosis on Stage. Friedrich Mellinger

1890 births
1970 deaths
German male actors